Yujiro Imano is a former international table tennis player from Japan.

Table tennis career
He won a bronze medal at the 1971 World Table Tennis Championships with Katsuyuki Abe and another bronze in the men's team event at the 1973 World Table Tennis Championships.

See also
 List of table tennis players
 List of World Table Tennis Championships medalists

References

Japanese male table tennis players
Living people
World Table Tennis Championships medalists
Year of birth missing (living people)